Toli County is a county situated in the north of the Xinjiang Uyghur Autonomous Region and is under the administration of the Tacheng Prefecture. The Postcode is 834500.

Administrative divisions 
Town (镇)
Toli Town (托里镇, تولى) | Tieguanggou (铁厂沟镇, تۆمۈرتام بازىرى (تېچاڭگۇ بازىرى)) |  Miaoergou (Out) (庙尔沟镇, ئۇت بازىرى)
	
Township (乡)
Duolate Township (多拉特乡, دولاتى يېزىسى)  |  Wuxuete Township (乌雪特乡, ئۆرشۆلىت يېزىسى)|  Kupu Township (库普乡, كۈپ يېزىسى)|  Ahkebielidou Township (阿克别里斗乡, ئاقبېلدىۋ يېزىسى)

Others
 Baiyanghe Forest station (白杨河林场) |  Laofengkou Forest station (老风口林场)|  Baerlukeshantasi Special Forest station (巴尔鲁克山塔斯特林场)| 兵团170团 XPCC 170 unit

Climate

References

County-level divisions of Xinjiang
Tacheng Prefecture